Bernardina is a female given name.  It may refer to:

Bernardina Adriana Schramm, a New Zealand pianist and music teacher
Princess Bernardina Christina Sophia of Saxe-Weimar-Eisenach, a princess of Saxe-Weimar-Eisenach and Schwarzburg-Rudolstadt
Berny Boxem-Lenferink (Bernardina Maria Boxem-Lenferink), a Dutch middle-distance runner

See also
Bernardine
Bernardino